Walter Selby Kennedy Jones (July 24, 1919 – June 5, 1978) was a lawyer and political figure in Nova Scotia. He represented Queens in the Nova Scotia House of Assembly from 1953 to 1971 as a Progressive Conservative member.

He was born in Sault Ste. Marie, Ontario, the son of Charles H. L. Jones and Elizabeth Kennedy, and was educated at King's College and Dalhousie University. In 1942, he married Anne Seaborne. He was named Speaker of the House of Assembly of Nova Scotia in 1957. Jones served in the Executive Council of Nova Scotia as Minister of Public Welfare, Provincial Secretary, Minister of Trade and Industry, Minister of Finance, and Minister of Municipal Affairs. He died in 1978.

References 

 Canadian Parliamentary Guide, 1960, PG Normandin

1919 births
1978 deaths
Progressive Conservative Association of Nova Scotia MLAs
Members of the Executive Council of Nova Scotia
Speakers of the Nova Scotia House of Assembly
Dalhousie University alumni
University of King's College alumni
People from Queens County, Nova Scotia
People from Sault Ste. Marie, Ontario
20th-century Canadian politicians